Corning Union Elementary School District is a public school district based in Tehama County, California.

History

2017 shooting

On November 14, 2017, a shooting occurred near Rancho Tehama Elementary School. Five people were killed while multiple others were wounded. The shooter attempted to enter the school but was unable to do so as staff members had placed the school on lockdown after hearing gunshots. He shot at the school for approximately six minutes, injuring one student. The gunman was later shot and killed by local authorities.

References

External links
 

School districts in California